Myles Robert Rene Frechette (25 April 1936 – 1 July 2017) was U.S. Ambassador to Cameroon (1983-1987) and Colombia (1994-1997). A career diplomat, he joined the US Foreign Service in 1963; other positions include assistant U.S. trade representative for Latin America, the Caribbean, and Africa from 1990 to 1993. He was also Senior Associate with the Center for Strategic and International Studies.

References

External links
 State Department page
 

	

1936 births
2017 deaths
Ambassadors of the United States to Colombia
Ambassadors of the United States to Cameroon
United States Foreign Service personnel